Miles Davis Quintet (PRLP 185) is a 10 inch LP album by Miles Davis, released in 1954 by Prestige Records. The album title is not to be confused with either of Davis' later Great Quintets. The three tracks on this LP, and one other, were recorded at Rudy Van Gelder's Studio, Hackensack, New Jersey, on April 3, 1954. This was the first session for Prestige Davis recorded at Gelder's home studio, as he would all his remaining sessions for the label.

After the 10" LP format was discontinued, tracks 1 & 2 were included on Side 2 of the 12" album Walkin' (PRLP 7076), and track 3 was reissued on the 12" album Blue Haze (PRLP 7054). A fourth song from the same session, "Love Me or Leave Me", was also included on Walkin'.

Track listing

Personnel
 Miles Davis – trumpet
 Dave Schildkraut – alto saxophone (1 & 3)
 Horace Silver – piano
 Percy Heath – bass
 Kenny Clarke – drums

References

1954 albums
Miles Davis albums
Prestige Records albums
Albums recorded at Van Gelder Studio
Albums produced by Bob Weinstock